USS Lee may refer to the following ships of the United States Navy:

 was a schooner chartered by the Continental Navy in October 1775 and returned to her owner November 1777
 was a galley in service to the Continental Navy during September–October 1776

United States Navy ship names